Richard C. Ross (May 5, 1927 – March 11, 2012) was an American politician who served in the New York State Assembly from the 88th district from 1973 to 1980.

He died on March 11, 2012, in Indio, California at age 84. Services were held at the Riverside Memorial Chapel in Manhattan. He was survived by his wife Joan (née Flug) and three children, Marcia Ross (married to Jeff Kaufman), William Ross, and Andrew Ross.

References

1927 births
2012 deaths
Republican Party members of the New York State Assembly
Jewish American people in New York (state) politics